The following is a list of the television networks and announcers who have broadcast the National Football League's Pro Bowl throughout the years.

1950s

Notes

From the 1951 thru the 1964 seasons, the Pro Bowl television rightsholders were the Los Angeles Newspaper Charities, as opposed to the National Football League. Since the 1965 season, the NFL has owned the telecast rights. 
 
The DuMont Television Network obtained rights to the 1955 game from the Los Angeles Newspaper Charities just one week before the game date. As they had trouble lining up affiliates to cover the game on such short notice, the telecast was cancelled.

Both NBC and CBS passed on the rights to the 1957 game. ABC apparently considered televising the game, but could not gain enough clearance of affiliates to make a telecast feasible. So for the third straight year, there was no telecast.

1960s

1970s

Notes
For the first four seasons following the AFL-NFL merger (–), CBS and NBC alternated coverage of the Super Bowl and Pro Bowl.

The game was part of ABC's Monday Night Football package from the  through  seasons (the 1975–1987 games). By 1986, ABC's coverage of the Pro Bowl promoted under the Wide World of Sports anthology series umbrella.

1980s

Notes
In 1980 (the first year that the Pro Bowl was in Hawaii), Al Michaels filled-in for Frank Gifford on play-by-play. Gifford was in Austria covering the World Championships of Skiing.

Although Hawaii does not have an NFL team of its own, the Pro Bowl games played there from 1980–2009 were still subject to the NFL's blackout policies, requiring the game to be blacked out within the state of Hawaii if all seats were not sold out by the specified 72-hour deadline.

1990s

2000s

Notes
Because ABC Sports had rights to both the Pro Bowl and the NHL All-Star Game, through their association agreement with ESPN, from 2000 through 2003, excluding 2002, ABC aired both games on the same day. ABC dubbed these doubleheaders as “All-Star Sunday”.

In 2003, John Madden declined to be part of the announcing crew due to his aviatophobia and claustrophobia. He was replaced on the telecast by former San Diego Chargers quarterback Dan Fouts, whom Madden had replaced on the Monday Night Football crew. This was also the case in 2009, when Cris Collinsworth filled in for Madden on NBC's coverage.

In 2004–2006, ABC (who by the early 2000s, had been suffering through several years of dismal ratings) sold its rights to the Pro Bowl (which had been part of the Monday Night Football package since 1995) to sister network ESPN. In those years, the ESPN Sunday Night Football crew covered the game. Prior to the game being moved to ESPN, ABC considered moving the game to Monday night.

Under the eight year television contract beginning in 2006, the network that broadcasts the Super Bowl would also get the Pro Bowl. Typically, CBS and Fox would utilize their "B" or "Number 2" broadcasting crew.

The 2007 game on CBS was held on the Saturday after Super Bowl XLI because of the Grammy Awards.

2010s

Notes

The 2010 game was the first time ever that the Pro Bowl was held prior to the championship game.  It was held the weekend before Super Bowl XLIV. NFL Commissioner Roger Goodell said the move was made after looking at alternatives to strengthen the Pro Bowl. The game was also moved up in order to prevent a conflict that would have occurred if the game had taken place on February 13 or 14 (CBS would have rights, and based on the 52nd Grammy Awards, would have moved the game to the Saturday, as they did in 2007), with the game facing against the NBA All-Star Game, Winter Olympics, and Daytona 500.
CBS gave up the rights to the 2013 game to NBC.

ESPN currently has the rights to air the Pro Bowl, It began in 2015. Starting in 2018, the game will be simulcast on broadcast network ABC, marking the return of the Pro Bowl to network television for the first time since 2014, while being ABC's first telecast since 2003. In 2019, ESPN's telecast of the Pro Bowl also aired on children's channel Disney XD.

2020s

Notes

Early in the first quarter of the 2020 Pro Bowl, an ABC News special report (which was also simulcast on ESPN, but not Disney XD) interrupted the game following up on the developing story of NBA star Kobe Bryant's death. Disney XD's simulcast abruptly ended with roughly six minutes remaining in the second quarter due to the breaking news of Bryant's death. 

ABC, ESPN, and Disney XD aired a television special in place of the 2021 game—the Pro Bowl Celebration—which would feature segments and interviews honoring the Pro Bowl roster, and highlights of the 2020 season, and promoting the digital Pro Bowl event.

See also
List of AFL All-Star Game broadcasters
List of Playoff Bowl broadcasters

References

External links
ESPN to televise 2010 Pro Bowl
Pro Bowl Numbers Game
Episode List: AFC/NFC Pro Bowl - TV Tango

Football on NBC
National Football League announcers
CBS Sports
Fox Sports announcers
ABC Sports
National Football League on the radio
National Football League on television
ESPN announcers
DuMont Television Network original programming
Broadcasting lists
American football-related lists
CBS Radio Sports
NBC Radio Sports
Wide World of Sports (American TV series)
Simulcasts
Disney XD